Abhishek Paradkar (born  8 November 2000) is an American cricketer who plays for the United States cricket team. In June 2021, he was selected to take part in the Minor League Cricket tournament in the United States following the players' draft. In August 2021, Paradkar was named in the United States' One Day International (ODI) squad for the rescheduled tri-series in Oman and their matches against Papua New Guinea. He made his ODI debut on 9 September 2021, for the United States against Papua New Guinea.

References

External links
 

2000 births
Living people
American cricketers
United States One Day International cricketers
Sportspeople from San Diego
Cricketers from California
American sportspeople of Indian descent